Santa María, Oaxaca may refer to:
Santa María Alotepec
Santa María Apazco
Santa María Atzompa
Santa María Camotlán
Santa María Chachoapam
Santa María Chilchotla
Santa María Chimalapa
Santa María Colotepec
Santa María Cortijo
Santa María Coyotepec
Santa María del Rosario
Santa María del Tule
Santa María Ecatepec
Santa María Guelacé
Santa María Guienagati
Santa María Huatulco
Santa María Huazolotitlán
Santa María Ipalapa
Santa María Ixcatlán
Santa María Jacatepec
Santa María Jalapa del Marqués
Santa María Jaltianguis
Santa María la Asunción
Santa María Lachixío
Santa María Mixtequilla
Santa María Nativitas
Santa María Nduayaco
Santa María Ozolotepec
Santa María Pápalo
Santa María Peñoles
Santa María Petapa
Santa María Quiegolani
Santa María Sola
Santa María Tataltepec
Santa María Tecomavaca
Santa María Temaxcalapa
Santa María Temaxcaltepec
Santa María Teopoxco
Santa María Tepantlali
Santa María Texcatitlán
Santa María Tlahuitoltepec
Santa María Tlalixtac
Santa María Tonameca
Santa María Totolapilla
Santa María Xadani
Santa María Yalina
Santa María Yavesía
Santa María Yolotepec
Santa María Yosoyúa
Santa María Yucuhiti
Santa María Zacatepec
Santa María Zaniza
Santa María Zoquitlán

See also
Municipalities of Oaxaca